Louise Hurtubise (born October 11, 1953) is a former Canadian handball player who competed in the 1976 Summer Olympics.

Born in Montreal, Quebec, Hurtubise was part of the Canadian handball team, which finished sixth in the Olympic tournament. She played four matches and scored two goals.

References

1953 births
Living people
Canadian female handball players
French Quebecers
Olympic handball players of Canada
Handball players at the 1976 Summer Olympics
Sportspeople from Montreal